The Central Antillean slider (Trachemys stejnegeri) is a species of turtle in the family Emydidae. The species is found on three islands in the West Indies: Hispaniola, Great Inagua, and Puerto Rico.

Etymology
The specific name, stejnegeri, is in honor of Norwegian-born American herpetologist Leonhard Stejneger.

Geographic range
T. stejnegeri is found on the islands of Puerto Rico, Great Inagua, and Hispaniola (Dominican Republic and Haiti).

Subspecies
Three subspecies are recognized as being valid, including the nominotypical subspecies.
Trachemys stejnegeri stejnegeri  – Puerto Rican slider
Trachemys stejnegeri malonei  – Inagua slider
Trachemys stejnegeri vicina  – Dominican slider

Nota bene: A trinomial authority in parentheses indicates that the subspecies was originally described in a genus other than Trachemys.

References

External links

Further reading
Schmidt KP (1928). "Scientific Survey of Puerto Rico and the Virgin Islands: Amphibians and Land Reptiles of Puerto Rico, With a List of Those Reported from the Virgin Islands". New York Acad. Sci. 10 (1): 1–160. (Pseudemys stejnegeri, new species, pp. 147–150; Figures 51–52).
Schwartz A, Thomas R (1975). A Check-list of West Indian Amphibians and Reptiles. Carnegie Museum of Natural History Special Publication No. 1. Pittsburgh, Pennsylvania: Carnegie Museum of Natural History. 216 pp. (Chrysemys decussata stejnegeri, new combination, p. 47; C. d. vicina, new combination, p. 48; C. malonei, p. 48).

Trachemys
Reptiles described in 1928
Reptiles of the Dominican Republic
Reptiles of Haiti
Reptiles of the Bahamas
Taxonomy articles created by Polbot